Kaz James (born 1982) is an Australian singer-songwriter and DJ. He was raised in Melbourne and is of Italian and Greek origin. He released his first solo album, If They Knew, in 2008.

Kaz James was a co-founder in 2004 of the group BodyRockers, an Australian British electronic music duo collaboration, consisting of Kaz James and Dylan Burns. BodyRockers released a self-titled album BodyRockers in 2005 and had an international hit with the single "I Like the Way" also in 2005 before disbanding in 2007.

In 2011, Kaz James and British businessman David Abrahamovich started a London coffee chain called Grind.

BodyRockers

Before he started his career as a soloist, James was one half of BodyRockers, who rose to prominence in 2005 with their first release, "I Like the Way". This guitar-laden dance track reached No. 3 on the UK Singles Chart in April 2005 and achieved popularity in other regions of the world as well. A self-titled album was released, as was the group's follow-up single, "Round and Round". The duo, James and British guitarist Dylan Burns, toured extensively in 2005 and 2006 and recorded a second album, but according to James, "we just didn't get around to releasing it". BodyRockers then parted ways in 2006.

Discography

Albums

Singles

References

1982 births
Australian people of Greek descent
Australian people of Italian descent
Australian DJs
Australian house musicians
Living people
Date of birth missing (living people)
Electronic dance music DJs
21st-century Australian singers
21st-century Australian male singers
People educated at Marcellin College, Bulleen